Michael Gardyne (born 23 January 1986) is a Scottish professional footballer who plays as a midfielder for Montrose. Gardyne previously played for Ross County, Morton, Kilmarnock, Dundee United and Inverness Caledonian Thistle.

Club career
Born in Dundee, Gardyne began his career with Celtic, the team he supported as a boy. He signed a professional contract in 2004 and was tipped to be one of the "next crop of youngsters to emerge" but found first-team opportunities limited and spent his first two seasons in the reserve team.

Once credited for performing a 'toilet activity' within a team mate's football boot.  Additionally, Gardyne himself confessed to being too focus on making team mates laugh rather than performing top quality skill at training while at Celtic.

Gardyne spent the 2006–07 season on loan to Ross County, scoring on his debut and being part of the side that won the 2006–07 Challenge Cup, scoring the first penalty in the shootout victory against Clyde.

After returning to Celtic, Gardyne left the club permanently and joined Greenock Morton on a free transfer on 31 August 2007, having worked with Morton manager Jim McInally previously in Celtic's youth team. The move lasted just five months, however and Gardyne returned to Ross County in January 2008, going on to help them win the Second Division title that season. Gardyne's form in the 2009–10 season saw him nominated for the Scottish Football League First Division Player of the Year and gain a Scottish Cup runners-up medal. The following season, Gardyne tasted cup success again when County won the Challenge Cup for the second time in three seasons.

Out of contract at the end of the 2011–12 season, Gardyne signed a pre-contract agreement with hometown Scottish Premier League club Dundee United in January 2012, some 18 months after the move was first rumoured. In early August, Gardyne scored on his league debut in the victory against Hibernian, appearing as a late substitute.

In August 2013, Gardyne joined Kilmarnock on loan for 6 months, and in January 2014 it was confirmed that the loan deal had been extended until the end of the season.

On 1 September 2014, Gardyne returned to Ross County, signing on loan until January 2015. He made his first appearance since returning to the club on 13 September 2014, in a 2–1 home defeat against Motherwell. Dundee United announced in April 2015 that Gardyne would be released when his contract expired at the end of the season.

In May 2015, Gardyne signed for Ross County on a permanent basis. Gardyne became Ross County's all-time top goal scorer on 29 December 2015 when he scored twice against Kilmarnock in a 3-2 win which brought him to 60 goals for County. On 13 March 2016, Gardyne scored the opening goal as Ross County won their first major silverware with a 2–1 victory over Hibernian in the Scottish League Cup. Gardyne was released by Ross County on 27 May 2021 along with nine other players and subsequently joined Highland derby rivals Inverness Caledonian Thistle. Gardyne would have his contract with the Caley Jags mutually terminated in January 2022.

Gardyne signed a two-and-a-half year deal with Montrose in January 2022.

Club statistics

Honours

Club
Ross County
 Scottish First Division (second tier): 2011–12, 2018–19
 Scottish Second Division (third tier): 2007–08
 Scottish Challenge Cup: 2006–07, 2010–11, 2018–19
Scottish League Cup: 2015–16

Individual
 PFA Scotland First Division Team of the Year: 2011–12
 PFA Scotland Team of the Year (Championship): 2018–19

References

External links

1986 births
Living people
Footballers from Dundee
Scottish footballers
Association football midfielders
Celtic F.C. players
Greenock Morton F.C. players
Ross County F.C. players
Dundee United F.C. players
Kilmarnock F.C. players
Scottish Football League players
Scottish Premier League players
Scottish Professional Football League players
Inverness Caledonian Thistle F.C. players
Montrose F.C. players